Murgul (Laz and Georgian: მურღული/Murghuli) is a town in Artvin Province in the Black Sea region of Turkey. It is the seat of Murgul District. Its population is 5,020 (2021).

Previously known as Damar and Göktaş, Murgul is on a tributary of the Çoruh River, with mountains on all sides.

Half of the land is mountain forest and most of the other half is meadow, only 5% is planted. There are various mining and mineral operations especially copper (Murgul has Turkey's largest copper reserve) and also iron and nitrates.

Climate
Murgul has an oceanic climate (Köppen: Cfb).

References

External links 
 the Municipality

Populated places in Artvin Province
Towns in Turkey
Murgul District